Norbert Ormai  28 May 1813 – 22 August 1849), born Norbert Auffenberg, was a honvéd colonel in the Hungarian Army. He was executed for his part in the Hungarian Revolution of 1848.

References
 Aradi Vértanúk Emléknapja, 2006. október 6. című tanulmány a Magyar Honvédvadász Hagyományőrző és Sportegyesület honlapján
 Róbert Hermann: Az aradi vértanúk temetései, Rubicon Történelmi Magazin 2009/3. szám pp. 52–54.
Merényi-Metzer Gábor: Az aradi vértanúk anyakönyvi bejegyzései, Budapest, Magyar Egyháztörténeti Enciklopédia Munkaközösség, 2010. p. 58. 
Babós Lajos: Az első aradi vértanú, Budapest, Ad Librum, 2016. p. 8.

1813 births
1849 deaths
Hungarian soldiers
Executed Hungarian people
People executed by the Austrian Empire
Hungarian people of German descent
19th-century executions by Austria
Executed German people
German Bohemian people
People from Dobřany